The Rembrandts are an American alternative rock duo, formed by Danny Wilde and Phil Solem in 1989. They had previously worked together as members of Great Buildings in 1981. The Rembrandts are best known for the song "I'll Be There for You", which was used as the main theme song for the NBC sitcom Friends.

History 
Wilde was a member of 1970s cult recording act The Quick, and had released several mildly successful solo albums in the 1980s. Wilde and Solem had been in the power-pop quartet Great Buildings, a band that released one album for CBS in 1981 before dissolving.

After establishing themselves as The Rembrandts in 1989, Solem and Wilde recorded a self-titled album largely in Wilde's home studio.  From this album, the group had their first success during 1990 with "Just the Way It Is, Baby", which scored at number 14 on the Billboard Hot 100. The self-titled album scored number 88 on the Billboard 200.

The next album Untitled, of 1992, featured the minor successes "Johnny, Have You Seen Her?" and "Chase the Clouds Away". Another track from the album, "Rollin' Down the Hill", was used in the film Dumb and Dumber.

"I'll Be There for You," the theme for the sitcom Friends, reached No. 1 on the Hot 100 Airplay chart for several weeks before being released as a single and peaking at No. 17 on the U.S. Billboard chart. The single has been released in other countries, including the UK, where it reached No. 3 in 1995 and No. 5 in 1997. The success of Friends has caused a greater awareness of the band, and led to greater sales of their recorded albums. The song was also featured on the Friends Soundtrack album.  An earlier, previously unreleased version of "I'll Be There for You" with different lyrics was included on their Unreleased Stuff album.

In 1997, the duo split, with Solem returning to Minneapolis to concentrate on his band Thrush. In 1998, Wilde released the album Spin This, credited to "Danny Wilde + The Rembrandts". In 2000, Solem and Wilde reunited, and released the album Lost Together as The Rembrandts the following year.

In 2005, the band released an album of re-recorded favorites called Choice Picks. There are two versions of Choice Picks, one released through Awarestore.com which features the new track "Chasin' Down a Rainbow". The other version was released on the Fuel 2000 label, with the new track "Don't Give Me Up".

In 2006, Rhino Records released a collection called Greatest Hits, a 20-song career-spanning retrospective that included material from the lone Great Buildings album, Apart from the Crowd.

In 2016, the pair reunited and announced that they would release a new album. Via Satellite was released in 2019.

Mainstream success 
Despite achieving success with "I'll Be There For You", the duo has been dismissive of the song. Phil Solem in 1995, said "We don't want to hang our hats on the theme from a TV show...[w]e've been working too long at our craft for that." The same year, the duo tried to apologize for the song on MTV News' "The Year in Rock".

Legacy 
In 2014, Rolling Stone ranked them the 20th best Two-Hit wonder of all time. Insider, placed them on their list of the "Best One-Hit Wonders of All Time".

Members 
 Danny Wilde  (born June 3, 1956, Houlton, Maine, U.S.)
 Phil Solem  (born July 1, 1956, Duluth, Minnesota, U.S.)

Discography

Studio albums

Compilation albums

Singles

See also 
 Pat Mastelotto
 Pete McRae

References

External links 
 
  at Myspace

American power pop groups
Jangle pop groups
Musical groups established in 1989
Musical groups disestablished in 1997
Musical groups reestablished in 2000
East West Records artists
Atlantic Records artists
Atco Records artists
Alternative rock groups from California
American pop rock music groups